Worfelden is a village in the municipality of Büttelborn, which is located in the triangle formed by the cities of Frankfurt, Mainz and Darmstadt, within the Rhine-Main region.

Geography

Location 
The parish of Worfeld lies entirely within the so-called Hegbach-Apfelbach Bottom (Hegbach-Apfelbach-Grund) in the western Lower Main Plain. In this respect it differs from Lage Büttelborn, whose southwestern corner lies within the Hessian Ried.

In the north Worfelden borders on Mörfelden, in the east on Schneppenhausen (Darmstadt-Dieburg), in the southeast on Braunshardt (Darmstadt-Dieburg), in the southwest on Büttelborn and in the west on Klein-Gerau.

Literature 
 Emil Hieke: Die Geschichte Worfeldens. Published by the municipal council (Gemeindeverwaltung), 1959
 Otto Klausing: Die naturräumlichen Einheiten auf Blatt 151 Darmstadt. Bad Godesberg, 1967
 Festschrift 750 Jahre Worfelden, 1975

References

External links 

 Geschichte der Ortsteile. In: Webauftritt der Gemeinde Büttelborn.
 
 

Groß-Gerau (district)
Former municipalities in Hesse